Jack Powell may refer to:

Jack Powell (athlete) (1910–1982), British Olympic athlete
Jack Powell (footballer, born 1860) (1860–1947), Welsh footballer
Jack Powell (footballer, born 1994), English footballer
Jack Powell (pitcher, born 1874) (1874–1944), American baseball pitcher
Jack Powell (1913 pitcher) (1891–1930), American baseball pitcher
Jack Powell (rugby union) (1882–1941), Welsh rugby union player

See also
Jackie Powell (1871–1955), South African rugby union player
John Powell (disambiguation)